Hilldale is a census-designated place (CDP) in Plains Township, Luzerne County, Pennsylvania, United States. The population was 1,246 at the time of the 2010 census.

Geography

It is located along North Main Street in Plains Township; it is directly northeast of the CDP of Plains. 

North Main Street continues northeastward into Jenkins Township, where it becomes South Main Street and passes through the CDP of Inkerman. The Susquehanna River is less than one-half mile northwest of Hilldale, separating the CDP from the boroughs of Wyoming and Forty Fort.

Demographics

References

Census-designated places in Luzerne County, Pennsylvania
Census-designated places in Pennsylvania